The 1960 Penn Quakers football team was an American football team that represented the University of Pennsylvania during the 1960 NCAA University Division football season. A year after winning the Ivy League, Penn dropped to sixth place in 1960. 

In their first year under head coach John Stiegman, the Quakers compiled a 3–6 record and were outscored 149 to 104. George Koval was the team captain.

Penn's 2–5 conference record was the sixth-best in the Ivy League standings. The Quakers were outscored 108 to 69 by Ivy opponents. 

Penn played its home games at Franklin Field adjacent to the university's campus in Philadelphia, Pennsylvania.

Schedule

References

Penn
Penn Quakers football seasons
Penn Quakers football